Shane Ryan (born 5 October 1978) is an Irish sportsman who plays hurling for the Dublin county team and, formerly, Gaelic football also for the Dublin county team (F), for which he received an All Star. Ryan plays his club hurling and football for Naomh Mearnóg and his preferred position is centre back, although he is known to have played many positions for Dublin. He made his senior debut for Dublin on 4 June 1999. He made the decision to concentrate solely on Gaelic football in 2004, which dealt a blow to the then hurling manager Humphrey Kelleher.  In 2009, he made the decision to switch back to hurling and join Anthony Daly's team after giving it much consideration. Ryan is a graduate of Business Studies (2001) in Dublin City University and is a teacher by profession.

Ryan has an illustrious ancestry in the Gaelic Athletic Association as his father, Jack Ryan, won an All-Ireland Senior Hurling Championship medal with Tipperary in 1971. His mother, the late Orla Ní Shíocháin was an inter-county camogie player with Dublin for many years and won three All-Ireland Senior Camogie medals. She also won many Interprovincial Championship medals with Leinster.  His paternal grandfather was Séamus O'Riain, President of the Gaelic Athletic Association 1967–70 and his maternal grandfather, Seán Ó Síocháin, was the first Director General of the Association, having served as General Secretary for many years.

Sporting achievements
Ryan was a Leinster Under 21 finalist in 1998 in football and a Leinster Minor and Under 21 finalist in 1996 and 1998 in hurling. He has won six Leinster Senior Football Championship medals with Dublin in 2002, 2005, 2006, 2007, 2008 and 2009. In 2011 Ryan won a National Hurling League medal and was part of the Dublin team that reached the All-Ireland Hurling semi-finals against Tipperary.

In 2006, Ryan won the Sigerson Cup with Dublin City University and was nominated for an All Star award for his performances with Dublin in Midfield. 2006 continued to be a good year for Ryan as Seán Boylan named him on the Compromise Rules squad to play Australia in the first test at Pearse Stadium on 29 October 2006. He then won his first All Star award in 2008, when he was named in midfield alongside Enda McGinley from Tyrone.
In May 2012, Ryan announced his retirement from the inter-county game due to plagues of injuries.

References

1978 births
Living people
Alumni of Dublin City University
Dual players
DCU Gaelic footballers
DCU hurlers
Dublin inter-county Gaelic footballers
Dublin inter-county hurlers
Irish international rules football players
Irish schoolteachers
Naomh Mearnóg Gaelic footballers
Naomh Mearnóg hurlers